Guðbjörg Guttormsdóttir (born November 6, 1989) is a retired Icelandic figure skater. She is the 2012 National Champion, 2008 Junior bronze medalist and 2005 Novice silver medalist. She also has a gold from Reykjvík International Games 2013.

Career
She started skating in 1998 at the Reykjavík Skating Club where her main coaches were Jennifer Molin and Guillaume Kermen and later Nikolay Shashkov. During summers she skated in Sweden and USA with Molin and in France with Patrice Paillares. During 2009-2010 she skated in Vancouver B.C at the Vancouver Skating Club with coach  but did not compete that year.

She represented the Icelandic National team at three Nordic Championships, twice as junior in 2008 and 2009, and once as senior in 2013.

Guðbjörg is the oldest of four sisters, all of which have skated. She later turned to coaching and judging and holds a national Technical Specialist licence.

She studied biology at the University of Iceland from 2010 to 2017 graduating with a MSc. degree and is currently working as a microbiologist.

Guðbjörg retired from competitive skating 2013.

Programs

Competitive highlights

Notes

References

Citations

Sources

External links 
 Nordics 2013 article
 Reykjavik International Games 2013 article MBL
 Nordics 2008 article
 Nordics 2013 article
 National Championships 2012 article RÚV

1989 births
Living people
Guðbjörg Guttormsdóttir
Sportspeople from Reykjavík
University of Iceland alumni